The Prince Edward Island Regulatory and Appeals Commission, informally shortened to the Island Regulatory and Appeals Commission or IRAC, is the independent tribunal and regulating arm of the Government of Prince Edward Island.

IRAC was established in 1991 following the amalgamation of the former Public Utilities Commission, the Land Use Commission and the Office of the Director of Residential Rental Property.  It is governed under the Island Regulatory and Appeals Commission Act.  IRAC reports directly to the Legislative Assembly of Prince Edward Island, currently through the Minister of Education and Early Childhood Development.

IRAC's responsibilities are quite broad and cover the following issues:

 petroleum pricing
 establishment of petroleum retail stations
 property taxes and appeals
 unsightly premises
 waste collection fees for the Island Waste Management Corporation (another agency of the provincial government)
 land use
 electricity rates for Maritime Electric and Summerside Electric Utility
 municipal water and sewer rates
 residential property rent rate increases

See also
 Nova Scotia Utility and Review Board

External links
IRAC - official website

Prince Edward Island government departments and agencies